Heck is a surname. Notable people with the surname include:

Alfons Heck (1928–2005), German American human rights activist
Albert J. R. Heck (born 1964), Dutch chemist
Andy Heck (born 1967), American football player and coach
Bruno Heck (1917–1989) German politician (CDU), confidant of Konrad Adenauer
Charlie Heck (born 1996), American football player; son of Andy 
Denny Heck (born 1952), American politician and Congressman
Dieter Thomas Heck (born 1937), German television presenter
Don Heck (1929–1995), American comic book artist 
Heinz Heck (1894–1982), German zoo director 
Homer Heck (1936–2014), American politician
Joe Heck, American politician from Nevada
Ludwig Heck  (1860–1951), German zoo director
Lutz Heck (1892–1983), German zoo director
Max W. Heck (1869–1938), American politician
Paul Heck (born 1967), American music producer
Peter Heck (born 1941), American science fiction author
Richard F. Heck (1931–2015), American chemist
Rose Marie Heck (born 1932), American politician
Victor Heck (born 1967), American editor and horror fiction author
Walter Heck, German graphic designer

Fictional characters
The Hecks, family from the fictional Orson, Indiana in The Middle TV series.

See also
Van der Heck
Hecke (surname)
Hecht (surname)

German-language surnames